is a Japanese actress and model. She has had a prolific film career since her teenage years and has starred in various blockbusters, receiving multiple accolades, including five Japan Academy Film Prizes and four Blue Ribbon Awards.

Nagasawa began her acting career at age twelve, when she starred as a young psychic orphan in the science fiction film Pyrokinesis (2000). While in high school, she starred as one of the Shobijin in Godzilla: Tokyo S.O.S. (2003) and Godzilla: Final Wars (2004) and would gain recognition for her leading role in Crying Out Love in the Center of the World (2004), for which she won the Blue Ribbon Award for Best Supporting Actress and two Japan Academy Film Prize awards.

In 2007, Nagasawa was nominated for the Japan Academy Film Prize for Best Leading Actress and attained a Bunshun Raspberry Award for playing the title character in Tears for You (2006). Nagasawa's career progressed with her starring roles as Princess Yuki in Shinji Higuchi's Hidden Fortress: The Last Princess (2008), Umi Matsuzaki in Gorō Miyazaki's From Up on Poppy Hill (2011), and Miyuki Matsuo in the romantic comedy Love Strikes! (2011), for which she earned a second Blue Ribbon Award for Best Supporting Actress.

After playing a supporting character in Makoto Shinkai's Your Name (2016), she portrayed the protagonist in the critically acclaimed science fiction drama Before We Vanish (2017), for which she won the Mainichi Film Award for Best Actress. In 2019, she starred in the crime mystery Masquerade Hotel and portrayed Yang Duan He in the action-adventure Kingdom, for which she was nominated for a Nikkan Sports Film Award. Nagasawa has also played Darko in The Confidence Man JP film trilogy (2019-2022), Anna Kobayashi in Chen Sicheng's buddy-comedy Detective Chinatown 3 (2021), and Hiroko Asami in Higuchi's critically acclaimed superhero film Shin Ultraman (2022).

Early life and background 
Nagasawa was born on June 3, 1987, in Iwata, Shizuoka. She stated that during her childhood, her father, the former Júbilo Iwata manager Kazuaki Nagasawa, "wasn't at home much because of work". She has an older brother who actress Yoshino Kimura described as "handsome" and Nagasawa described as "cool".

Career

Film

In 2000, Nagasawa won the Grand Prix at the 5th Toho Cinderella Audition, prevailing 35,153 female competitors. After winning the competition, Toho instructed director Shusuke Kaneko to give her a role in his science fiction action film Pyrokinesis. She played Kurata, an orphan child who has psychic powers such as pyrokinesis and psychometry. At the wrap party for the film, Kaneko said she had "no experience and directing her was a pain in the ass". Two years later she played minor roles in Nobuhiko Obayashi's Nagori Yuki and Akihiko Shiota's Yomigaeri. She also starring as one of the Shobijin in Godzilla: Tokyo S.O.S. (2003) and Godzilla: Final Wars (2004). Her first lead role in a film was in 2003's Robot Contest.

Nagasawa's performance in Crying Out Love in the Center of the World received both a Blue Ribbon Award and a Japan Academy Prize for Best Supporting Actress.

In 2007, she received a Japan Academy Prize nomination in the Best Actress category for her performance in the 2006 film Nada Sōsō (Tears for You). After a string of less notable films, including Gunjo and Magare Spoon!, she starred in the 2011 film adaptation of Mitsurō Kubo's manga Moteki. Her performance in Moteki won Nagasawa a Blue Ribbon Award for Best Supporting Actress, and she was nominated for a Japan Academy Award in the Best Actress category. That same year Nagasawa expanded into voice acting by providing the voice of character "Umi Matsuzaki" in the Studio Ghibli film From Up on Poppy Hill.  In 2016 she provided the voice for the character "Miki Okudera" in the international hit Your Name.

Her live action films have also received international attention. Kiyoku Yawaku (Beyond the Memories), a live action adaptation of Ryo Ikuemi's manga series, was screened at the 17th annual Japanese Film Festival in Melbourne, Australia in 2013. [[Our Little Sister|Umimachi Diary (Our Little Sister)]], a live action adaptation of Akimi Yoshida's manga, competed for the Palme d'Or at the 2015 Cannes Film Festival. In 2017 Nagasawa starred in the Kiyoshi Kurosawa film Before We Vanish, which competed in the Un Certain Regard category at the 2017 Cannes Film Festival. Her performance in Before We Vanish also received recognition in Japan, winning a Mainichi Film Award for Best Lead Actress, and earning a nomination for a Japan Academy Prize for Outstanding Performance by an Actress in a Leading Role.

In 2018, she starred in 50 First Kisses, a Japanese remake of the 2004 American film 50 First Dates.

Television
Nagasawa starred in many Japanese television drama series. Early supporting roles in the 2002 NHK asadora Sakura and the 2005 Tokyo Broadcasting System Television live action manga adaptation Dragon Zakura led to more TV work, including a leading role in the 2007 Fuji TV series Proposal Daisakusen (Operation Love). Her performance in Proposal Daisakusen (Operation Love) received the most votes in the Nikkan Sports Drama Grand Prix Best Actress category.

After her initial success in television, Nagasawa continued to perform in both supporting and leading television drama roles. In 2009 she played a supporting role in the NHK taiga drama Tenchijin, and in 2010 she joined several other leading Japanese actors in the Fuji TV 50th anniversary mini-series Wagaya no Rekishi. In 2012 her performance in the TV Asahi drama Toshi densetsu no onna'' won the 73rd Television Drama Academy Best Actress Award. In 2013 she learned Chinese to play a leading role in the Taiwan Television adaptation of the manga series Chocolat. Nagasawa returned to NHK in the 2016 taiga drama Sanada Maru.

Personal life
Nagasawa lives in Meguro, Tokyo.

Filmography

Film

Dubbing

Television

Awards and nominations

References

External links

Profile on Toho Entertainment 

1987 births
Living people
Actors from Shizuoka Prefecture
Japanese film actresses
Japanese television actresses
Japanese female models
Japanese radio personalities
Japanese female idols
20th-century Japanese actresses
21st-century Japanese actresses
Horikoshi High School alumni